Baccus may be either a given name or surname shared by several notable people, among them being:

 Gabriel Baccus Matthews (1948–2007), Liberian politician
 Kearyn Baccus (born 1991), Australian footballer
 Keanu Baccus (born 1998), Australian footballer
 Rick Baccus (21st century), United States Army general
 Steven Baccus (born 1977), Seychellois Olympic weightlifter
 Whitey Baccus (1911–1968), American basketball player and coach
 Baccus ( born 1990), French DJ

See also
 Bacchus
 Backus (disambiguation)